The Piano Sonata No. 3 in F minor, Op. 5 of Johannes Brahms was written in 1853 and published the following year. The sonata is unusually large, consisting of five movements, as opposed to the traditional three or four. When he wrote this piano sonata, the genre was seen by many to be past its heyday. Brahms, enamored of Beethoven and the classical style, composed Piano Sonata No. 3 with a masterful combination of free Romantic spirit and strict classical architecture. As a further testament to Brahms' affinity for Beethoven, the Piano Sonata is infused with the instantly recognizable motive from Beethoven's Symphony No. 5 during the first, third, and fourth movements. Composed in Düsseldorf, it marks the end of his cycle of three sonatas, and was presented to Robert Schumann in November of that year; it was the last work that Brahms submitted to Schumann for commentary. Brahms was barely 20 years old at its composition. The piece is dedicated to Countess Ida von Hohenthal of Leipzig.

A performance of the work generally lasts between 30 and 40 minutes, depending on whether repeats are observed.

Form
The sonata is in five movements:

Movements

First movement
The first movement begins with fortissimo chords that span almost the entire range of the piano register. A movement in sonata form, it is essentially composed of two musical subjects. The first of these is in F minor, which is followed by a brief episode that features the "fate motif" from Ludwig van Beethoven's Symphony No. 5 in the same key as the symphony, C minor. After a return of the initial F minor subject, the second subject area begins in the key of the relative major (A major) but ends in D major. Brahms uses these keys in the same way in the second movement of this sonata as well. The exposition is repeated and leads to a complex development section in which the "fate motif" is incorporated. After the beginning of the recapitulation, the piece moves directly to the second subject, by-passing the C minor episode, in the parallel key of F major, and finishes with an extended coda.

Second movement
The second movement begins with a quotation above the music of a poem by Otto Inkermann under the pseudonym C.O. Sternau.
{|
|-
|Der Abend dämmert, das Mondlicht scheint,da sind zwei Herzen in Liebe vereintund halten sich selig umfangen||Through evening's shade, the pale moon gleamsWhile rapt in love's ecstatic dreamsTwo hearts are fondly beating.
|}

Perhaps symbolizing the two beating hearts in this Andante are its two principal themes, one in A major and the other in D major, which alternate throughout the movement. Like the second subject of the first movement's exposition, this movement exemplifies progressive tonality as it ends in D major rather than the key in which it began, A major.

Third movement
The third movement, a scherzo and trio, begins in F minor with a musical quotation of the beginning of the finale of Felix Mendelssohn's Piano Trio No. 2, Op. 66. In contrast to the tumult of the scherzo, the trio in D major is calm and lyrical, and the accompanying bass too refers to Beethoven's "fate motif". Once the trio brings back the movement's opening material at its close, the scherzo is repeated in whole.

Fourth movement
The fourth movement is marked as an intermezzo and is given the title "Rückblick", literally "Remembrance". It begins with the initial theme of the second movement, but in the key of B minor. Like the opening and third movements, the "fate motif" figures prominently throughout the intermezzo.

Fifth movement
The fifth and final movement is a rondo in the home key of F minor. It explores several ideas that become intertwined in the virtuosic and triumphant close. Notably, the first diversion from the rondo theme begins with a musical cryptogram that was a personal musical motto of his lifelong friend Joseph Joachim, the F–A–E theme, which stands for Frei aber einsam (free but lonely). The second episode, in D major, uses four pitches, F, E, D, A, as the basis for a great deal of the musical material that follows. Like Brahms's Piano Sonata No. 2, this sonata's finale also ends in the parallel major.

See also
 Piano Sonata No. 1 (Brahms)
 Piano Sonata No. 2 (Brahms)
 F-A-E Sonata

References

External links
 

Piano sonatas by Johannes Brahms
1853 compositions
Compositions in F minor